Aspidites is a genus of pythons endemic to Australia. The name can be translated as "shield bearer" and pertains to the symmetrically shaped head scales. Currently, two species are recognized.

Description
These snakes lack the heat-sensitive pits between the labial scales that most other python species have.

The head is slightly wider than the neck, and the eyes are small, with a vertically elliptic pupils.

Distribution and habitat
They are found in Australia except in the south of the country.

Behavior
Both species are nocturnal, and terrestrial.

Reproduction
Oviparous, the females stay with their eggs until they hatch.

Species

T) Type species.

Taxonomy
Two new subspecies, A. ramsayi panoptes, the western woma python, and A. r. richardjonesii, the desert woma python, were described by Hoser (2001). However, these descriptions are questionable, as they do not include proper diagnoses and seem to be based only on distribution.

References

Further reading
Krefft G. 1864. Description of Aspidiotes melanocephalus, a New Snake from Port Denison, N.E. Australia. Proc. Zool. Soc. London 1864: 20–22. ("Aspidiotes, nov. gen.", p. 20.)
Peters W. 1877. Über die von S.M.S. Gazelle mitgebrachten Amphibien. Monatsberichte der Königlichen Preussischen Akademie der Wissenschaften zu Berlin 1876: 528–535, 914. (Aspidiotus melanocephalus, p. 533; and Aspidites, p. 914.)

External links

 

Pythonidae
Snake genera
Taxa named by Wilhelm Peters
Snakes of Australia